Lara Nielsen (born 19 December 1992) is an Australian athlete. She competed in the women's hammer throw at the 2018 Commonwealth Games, winning the bronze medal.

References

External links
 
 Lara Nielsen at Athletics Australia
 

1992 births
Living people
Australian female hammer throwers
Place of birth missing (living people)
Athletes (track and field) at the 2018 Commonwealth Games
Commonwealth Games bronze medallists for Australia
Commonwealth Games medallists in athletics
Medallists at the 2018 Commonwealth Games